Desiderata Program (Also known as Desiderata Alternative Program, Desiderata High School, and Desi by its own students) is an alternative high school that forms part of the Phoenix Union High School District in Phoenix, Arizona.

History
The program began in 1977, and its name, which means "desired things" in Latin, comes from an eponymous prose poem by Max Ehrmann.

Students 
Students are referred to the Desiderata Program by their home school campuses. The program caters to students with behavioral and emotional disabilities, including those with anxiety, depression, and phobias who learn better in smaller environments.

Enrollment figures are not available, but a 2015 article by Arizona Republic noted the program had about 140 students at the time.

Campus 
The program began operations at its new  facility, located near 35th Avenue and Thomas Road, in 2006. An architecture studio was selected in 2004 to design the new space. Prior to 2006, the program operated out of a historic building that was built in the 1920s.

References

External links
 

Public high schools in Arizona
High schools in Phoenix, Arizona
Special schools in the United States
Educational institutions established in 1977
1977 establishments in Arizona